Mike Rowland is a wheelwright and coachbuilder located in Colyton, Devon.

Biography 
The business was established in 1964. Rowland and his son Greg run their own family-owned business together. They were awarded the Royal Warrant of Appointment in January 2005 by Queen Elizabeth II as her wheelwrights and coachbuilders. All work is still done by hand in the traditional way; that is the same since hundreds of years. For the 2011 Wedding of Prince William and Catherine Middleton, Rowlands was responsible for the maintenance of the wheels of the royal and state chariots and carriages.

Rowlands also build wheels for canons and take other orders in for the construction or maintenance of carriages and coaches. Carriages are built by eye. They also supplied wheels for the Hollywood blockbuster Gladiator.

References

External links 
 Homepage of Mike Rowland & Son
 BBC News | South West's businesses kept busy by royal appointment
 The Telegraph | Royal Warrant holders: the seal of approval

British Royal Warrant holders
People from East Devon District
Living people
Year of birth missing (living people)
Place of birth missing (living people)
Businesspeople from Devon